Patrick Power (born 1895) was an Irish hurler who played as a centre-forward for the Tipperary senior team.

Power made his first appearance for the team during the 1917 championship and was a regular member of the starting fifteen until his retirement after the 1925 championship. During that time he won one All-Ireland medal and three Munster medals.

At club level Power was a multiple county championship medalist with Boherlahan–Dualla.

His brother Jack also played with Tipperary.

References

1895 births
Year of death missing
Boherlahan-Dualla hurlers
Tipperary inter-county hurlers
All-Ireland Senior Hurling Championship winners